Edward Delaney Rudd (born November 8, 1962) is a retired American professional basketball player. At a height of 6'2" (1.88 m) tall, he played at the point guard position.

High school
Rudd attended and played high school basketball at Eastman High School, in Hollister, North Carolina.

College career

After high school, Rudd attended and played college basketball Wake Forest University, with the Wake Forest Demon Deacons, from 1981 to 1985.

Professional career
In his pro career, Rudd played in the Continental Basketball Association (CBA), and in the NBA with the Utah Jazz and the Portland Trail Blazers. He also played overseas, in Greece with PAOK, from 1986–1988, and in France, with ASVEL Lyon-Villeurbanne, from 1993 to 1999.

While playing for the Jazz, Rudd mostly served as a backup to future Hall of Famer John Stockton.  However, Rudd had a chance to shine in the 1992 Western Conference Finals against the Blazers.  In Game 5 of that series, which was tied at 2 games apiece, Stockton suffered an eye injury and thus was unable to continue playing.  Rudd stepped in as point guard for the Jazz, and with his team trailing 107-104 late in the fourth quarter, swished a 23-foot 3-pointer to silence the Portland crowd and send the game into overtime.

References

External links
College & NBA stats @ basketball-reference.com
Delaney Rudd @ basketstat.com

1962 births
Living people
African-American basketball players
American expatriate basketball people in France
American expatriate basketball people in Greece
American men's basketball players
ASVEL Basket players
Basketball players from North Carolina
Bay State Bombardiers players
Maine Windjammers players
P.A.O.K. BC players
People from Hollister, North Carolina
Point guards
Portland Trail Blazers players
Rapid City Thrillers players
Utah Jazz draft picks
Utah Jazz players
Wake Forest Demon Deacons men's basketball players
21st-century African-American people
20th-century African-American sportspeople